Chiusanico (locally ) is a comune (municipality) in the Province of Imperia in the Italian region of Liguria, located about  southwest of Genoa and about  northwest of Imperia.

Chiusanico borders the following municipalities: Borgomaro, Caravonica, Cesio, Chiusavecchia, Diano Arentino, Lucinasco, Pontedassio, Stellanello, and Testico.

Twin towns
 Vilobí del Penedès, Spain, since 2003

References

Cities and towns in Liguria